Goniodoris joubini is a species of sea slug, a dorid nudibranch, a marine gastropod mollusc in the family Goniodorididae.

Distribution
This species was first described from New Caledonia. Animals from Japan were described as Goniodoris glabra but appear to be the same species. Similar looking animals have been reported from Hong Kong, the Marshall Islands, Queensland and the Red Sea.

Description
This goniodorid nudibranch is predominantly brown in colour, with spots and large areas of white surface pigment on the oral tentacles and edges of the back and sides where they join along the pallial margin. The pallial margin is extended as a flap and is translucent brown with white patches which often have yellow spots at their centres.

Goniodoris aspersa Alder & Hancock, 1864 is described as follows:
Body elongated, densely and minutely freckled with dark chocolate-brown. Cloak oblong or subquadrate, with the margin slightly sinuated and turned up at the sides, and also in front, where it is bent back in a rounded lobe; the posterior end bending inwards behind the branchiae: the cloak is densely freckled like the rest of the body, having an irregular pale line running down each side: the margin is also pale, with a few black and yellow spots; and an irregular line of light spots runs along each side of the body below the pallial margin. An obtuse carinated ridge reaches from the mantle to the tail. Dorsal tentacles clavate and laminated, freckled with the same dark colour as the body. Branchial plumes five, small, twice or thrice pinnated, and placed a little apart from each other and from the anal nipple; they are darkly freckled above, with yellow tips; the under surface pale. Head squared in front and produced considerably beyond the cloak, the sides forming two moderate-sized tentacular processes held laterally. Foot yellowish, without markings, truncated in front, and rather narrow, with the sides almost parallel, extending beyond the cloak for about one-fourth of the whole length of the body, and terminating in a blunt point. Length nearly an inch. Tongue minute and like that of G. nodosa , but the sides of the spines are smooth; there is a buccal collar with rudimentary jaws, as in Doris pilosa.

Ecology
Goniodoris joubini probably feeds on bryozoans or colonial ascidians but the diet is apparently not yet determined.

References

Goniodorididae
Gastropods described in 1928